Arjun Singh Aligarh may refer to

 Arjun Singh (Madhya Pradesh politician), Indian politician, Chief Minister of Madhya Pradesh and Union Minister
 Arjun Singh (West Bengal politician), Indian politician in the West Bengal Legislative Assembly
 Arjun Singh Atwal (born 1973), Indian professional golfer
 Arjun Singh Jasrotia, Indian military officer, Ashok Chakra awardee
 Arjun Singh Sethi (born 1981), American writer and lawyer
 Jai Arjun Singh, Indian writer and journalist
 Raja Arjun Singh (1829–1890), leader of the Indian Rebellion

See also
 Arjan Singh (1919–2017), Marshal of the Indian Air Force